The 2015 WNBA season was the 16th season for the Seattle Storm of the WNBA.

WNBA Draft

Trades

Roster

Season standings

Schedule
Seattle Storm 2015 Schedule - Storm Home and Away - ESPN

Preseason

Playoffs

Statistics

Regular season

Awards and honors

References

External links
THE OFFICIAL SITE OF THE SEATTLE STORM

Seattle Storm seasons
Seattle
2015 in sports in Washington (state)
Seattle Storm